The 2022–23 Kaohsiung 17LIVE Steelers season will be the franchise's 2nd season, its second season in the P. LEAGUE+ (PLG), its 2nd in Kaohsiung City. The Steelers promoted Slavoljub Gorunovic, the head assistant coach for their previous season, to the head coach. The Steelers also hired Cheng Chih-Lung as their COO of the Basketball Affairs. The Steelers named Kenny Kao, former Hsinchu JKO Lioneers general manager, as their new general manager.

On October 13, 2022, the team was renamed to Kaohsiung 17LIVE Steelers. On October 28, the Steelers fired head coach Slavoljub Gorunovic before the season and named assistant coach, Hung Chi-Chao as their interim head coach. On November 10, 2022, the Steelers named Dean Murray as their head coach. On December 29, the Steelers fired Dean Murray and named assistant coach, Hung Chi-Chao as their interim head coach. On January 7, the Steelers named Cheng Chih-Lung as their head coach.

Draft 

On October 27, 2021, the Steelers' 2022 first-round draft pick was traded to Taipei Fubon Braves in exchange for Wang Lu-Hsiang.

Standings

Roster

Game log

Preseason 

|-style="background:#fcc"
| 1
| October 8
| Braves
| L 88–94
| Andrija Bojić (24)
| Andrija Bojić (16)
| Chen Yu-Wei (7)
| Fengshan Arena4,205
| 0–1
|-style="background:#fcc"
| 2
| October 10
| Lioneers
| L 102–111
| Femi Olujobi (34)
| Femi Olujobi (9)
| Chen Yu-Wei (6)
| Fengshan Arena3,306
| 0–2

Regular season 

|-style="background:#fcc"
| 1
| November 6
| @Braves
| L 114–117
| Femi Olujobi (28)
| Femi Olujobi (13)
| Chen Yu-Wei (10)
| Taipei Heping Basketball Gymnasium6,530
| 0–1
|-style="background:#fcc"
| 2
| November 12
| @Dreamers
| L 76–84
| Femi Olujobi (22)
| Femi Olujobi (14)
| Chen Yu-Wei (7)
| Intercontinental Basketball Stadium3,000
| 0–2
|-style="background:#fcc"
| 3
| November 19
| @Lioneers
| L 83–89
| Femi Olujobi (35)
| Femi Olujobi (18)
| Chen Yu-Wei (13)
| Hsinchu County Stadium5,238
| 0–3
|-style="background:#fcc"
| 4
| November 27
| Pilots
| L 78–108
| Terrence Jones (22)
| Terrence Jones (11)
| Terrence Jones (6)
| Fengshan Arena3,250 || 0–4
|-style="background:#fcc"
| 5
| November 29
| Lioneers
| L 101–102
| Terrence Jones (43)
| Terrence Jones (15)
| Chou Yi-Hsiang (5)
| Fengshan Arena2,505
| 0–5

|-style="background:#fcc"
| 6
| December 3
| Braves
| L 119–125
| Terrence Jones (39)
| Terrence Jones (12)
| Chen Yu-Wei (6)
| Fengshan Arena3,306
| 0–6
|-style="background:#cfc"
| 7
| December 4
| Kings
| W 115–95
| Terrence Jones (33)
| Femi Olujobi (18)
| Chen, Jones (5)
| Fengshan Arena3,260
| 1–6
|-style="background:#fcc"
| 8
| December 11
| @Pilots
| L 83–100
| Terrence Jones (30)
| Terrence Jones (15)
| Chen Yu-Wei (7)
| Taoyuan Arena2,187
| 1–7
|-style="background:#fcc"
| 9
| December 17
| @Braves
| L 80–114
| Femi Olujobi (32)
| Femi Olujobi (10)
| Chen, Harrison (4)
| Taipei Heping Basketball Gymnasium5,208
| 1–8
|-style="background:#fcc"
| 10
| December 20
| Kings
| L 89–100
| Aaron Harrison (23)
| Aaron Harrison (11)
| Wang Po-Chih (5)
| Fengshan Arena1,925
| 1–9
|-style="background:#fcc"
| 11
| December 24
| @Dreamers
| L 94–117
| Viacheslav Kravtsov (19)
| Viacheslav Kravtsov (14)
| Chen Yu-Wei (7)
| Intercontinental Basketball Stadium2,876
| 1–10
|-style="background:#fcc"
| 12
| December 27
| @Lioneers
| L 85–109
| Viacheslav Kravtsov (25)
| Lan Shao-Fu (12)
| Chen, Kravtsov (5)
| Hsinchu County Stadium3,517
| 1–11
|-style="background:#fcc"
| 13
| December 31
| @Kings
| L 86–109
| Viacheslav Kravtsov (28)
| Kravtsov, Lan (10)
| Chen Yu-Wei (9)
| Xinzhuang Gymnasium4,159
| 1–12

|-style="background:#fcc"
| 14
| January 6
| Pilots
| L 97–110
| Viacheslav Kravtsov (24)
| Viacheslav Kravtsov (12)
| Chen Yu-Wei (6)
| Fengshan Arena1,283
| 1–13
|-style="background:#cfc"
| 15
| January 8
| Dreamers
| W 105–88
| Jay West (25)
| Viacheslav Kravtsov (11)
| Jay West (8)
| Fengshan Arena1,988
| 2–13
|-style="background:#ccc"
| PPD
| January 14
| Braves
| colspan = 6 style="text-align:center"|Postponed
|-style="background:#ccc"
| PPD
| January 17
| @Kings
| colspan = 6 style="text-align:center"|Postponed
|-style="background:#fcc"
| 16
| January 29
| @Braves
| L 82–106
| Viacheslav Kravtsov (22)
| Chen Yu-Wei (8)
| Chen Yu-Wei (6)
| Taipei Heping Basketball Gymnasium5,240
| 2–14

|-style="background:#fcc"
| 17
| February 3
| Dreamers
| L 101–106
| Viacheslav Kravtsov (20)
| Kravtsov, Olujobi (9)
| Jay West (9)
| Fengshan Arena1,536
| 2–15
|-style="background:#fcc"
| 18
| February 5
| @Lioneers
| L 86–89
| Viacheslav Kravtsov (18)
| Viacheslav Kravtsov (13)
| Chen Yu-Wei (7)
| Hsinchu County Stadium5,582
| 2–16
|-style="background:#fcc"
| 19
| February 11
| Kings
| L 102–109
| Femi Olujobi (40)
| Femi Olujobi (7)
| Chen Yu-Wei (9)
| Fengshan Arena3,150
| 2–17
|-style="background:#cfc"
| 20
| February 12
| Dreamers
| W 95–80
| Viacheslav Kravtsov (24)
| Viacheslav Kravtsov (18)
| Jeremy Lin (13)
| Fengshan Arena5,321
| 3–17
|-style="background:#fcc"
| 21
| February 18
| @Dreamers
| L 91–102
| Viacheslav Kravtsov (26)
| Jeremy Lin (12)
| Jeremy Lin (5)
| Intercontinental Basketball Stadium3,000
| 3–18
|-style="background:#cfc"
| 22
| February 25
| @Lioneers
| W 95–82
| Jeremy Lin (32)
| Femi Olujobi (15)
| Jeremy Lin (7)
| Hsinchu County Stadium8,000
| 4–18
|-style="background:#fcc"
| 23
| February 28
| @Kings
| L 88–101
| Jeremy Lin (23) 
| Kravtsov, Olujobi (12)
| Jeremy Lin (6)
| Xinzhuang Gymnasium6,800
| 4–19
|-style="background:#fcc"

|-style="background:#cfc"
| 24
| March 5
| @Pilots
| W 93–63
| Jeremy Lin (26)
| Jeremy Lin (14)
| Chen, J. Lin (5)
| Taoyuan Arena4,300
| 5–19
|-style="background:#cfc"
| 25
| March 10
| Braves
| W 103–102
| Femi Olujobi (19)
| Femi Olujobi (18)
| Femi Olujobi (6)
| Fengshan Arena5,321
| 6–19
|-style="background:#fcc"
| 26
| March 11
| Lioneers
| L 76–85
| Viacheslav Kravtsov (23)
| Viacheslav Kravtsov (9)
| Chen Yu-Wei (10)
| Fengshan Arena5,127
| 6–20
|-style="background:#cfc"
| 27
| March 19
| @Pilots
| W 99–86
| Jeremy Lin (38)
| Wendell Lewis (19)
| J. Lin, Natesan (5)
| Taoyuan Arena4,300
| 7–20
|-
| 28
| March 25
| Braves
| 
| 
| 
| 
| Fengshan Arena
| 
|-
| 29
| March 26
| Pilots
| 
| 
| 
| 
| Fengshan Arena
| 

|-
| 30
| April 2
| @Dreamers
| 
| 
| 
| 
| Intercontinental Basketball Stadium
| 
|-
| 31
| April 8
| Lioneers
| 
| 
| 
| 
| Fengshan Arena
| 
|-
| 32
| April 9
| Braves
| 
| 
| 
| 
| Fengshan Arena
| 
|-
| 33
| April 14
| @Pilots
| 
| 
| 
| 
| Taoyuan Arena
| 
|-
| 34
| April 16
| @Kings
| 
| 
| 
| 
| Xinzhuang Gymnasium
| 
|-
| 35
| April 22
| Lioneers
| 
| 
| 
| 
| Fengshan Arena
| 
|-
| 36
| April 23
| Kings
| 
| 
| 
| 
| Fengshan Arena
| 
|-
| 37
| April 30
| @Kings
| 
| 
| 
| 
| Xinzhuang Gymnasium
| 

|-
| 38
| May 6
| @Braves
| 
| 
| 
| 
| Taipei Heping Basketball Gymnasium
| 
|-
| 39
| May 13
| Pilots
| 
| 
| 
| 
| Fengshan Arena
| 
|-
| 40
| May 14
| Dreamers
| 
| 
| 
| 
| Fengshan Arena
|

Player Statistics 
<noinclude>

Regular season

Transactions

Free Agency

Re-signed

Additions

Subtractions

Awards

Players of the Week

References 

Kaohsiung 17LIVE Steelers
Kaohsiung 17LIVE Steelers seasons